Alfredectes is a genus of bush crickets or katydids, which is endemic to South Africa.

Species
The genus contains the following species:
 Alfredectes browni Rentz, 1988 – Brown's shieldback
 Alfredectes semiaeneus (Serville, 1838) – Alfred's shieldback

References

Tettigoniinae
Tettigoniidae genera